The Bocas del Toro Research Station  (BRS) is a field station of the Smithsonian Tropical Research Institute (STRI) on Panama’s western Caribbean coast, is a platform for both marine and terrestrial biodiversity research. The station hosts a diverse group of scientists from more than 20 countries, every year.

Activities at the station contribute to the Smithsonian Institution’s primary mission: the increase and diffusion of knowledge. Visiting scientists are engaged in research on the biodiversity, ecology, paleontology and archaeology of the Bocas del Toro region. Educational and outreach activities range from hosting K-12 school groups, to specialized training for international graduate students.

Founded in 1998, the BRS campus has provided field accommodation since 2002 and a fully operational research laboratory since 2003. The facilities now include a running seawater system, a new dock, boat ramp, and additional support facilities, as well as two houses to accommodate visiting researchers. The BRS is arguably the preeminent field station in the Caribbean.
Visiting scientists hold lectures that are open to the public.

Outreach, education, and training 
Outreach and education at the Bocas del Toro Research Station spans a range of programs targeting K-12 students, university undergraduates, graduate students and young professionals. K-12 education includes visits to local schools, some of which are in remote mountainous locations, and student visits to the BRS. The station also offers a training workshop for local K-12 teachers every year, an organized beach clean-up for Earth day, and other activities for local residents.

They hold an annual Environmental Fair.

Biodiversity database 
The Bocas biodiversity database  provides a list of plants and animals that are known to occur in the Bocas del Toro Archipelago, the Bahía Almirante, Laguna de Chiriquí, and the surrounding mainland. Users can search for a particular term or browse the database by group.  Some photographs, videos, maps and audio recordings are available.

Facts and statistics
Location: Isla Colon, Bocas del Toro Province, Panama
Campus Size:  6 Hectares
Date of Purchase:  1998
Staff:  12 permanent staff
Director:  Dr. Rachel Collin
Capacity:  28 resident scientists and 15 off campus researchers
Annual Visitors:  325 scientific visitors work at the BRS every year
Publications:  200 peer-review publications have been generated from work at the BRS since 1998
Undergraduate Education:  9 undergraduate institutions including Princeton, Harvard, and Duke Universities teach undergraduate field classes at the BRS
Outreach:  3000 members of the public participate in the BRS outreach activities every year
Earth Day:  Over 2 tons of garbage are collected from local beaches during the BRS beach clean-up each year

References

Sources 
Collin R. 2005. "Ecological monitoring and biodiversity surveys at the Smithsonian Tropical Researcj Institute's Bocas del Toro Research Station". Caribbean Journal of Science 41: 367-374.

External links 
Home page of STRI's Bocas del Toro Research Station
Videoclips highlighting the Bocas del Toro Research Station and research
"Dispatch from Panama: Bocas del Toro", Smithsonian Magazine, September 15, 2009

Research institutes in Panama
Smithsonian Institution research programs
Research stations